Wilhelm Brekke (24 February 1887 – 17 May 1938) was a Norwegian footballer. He played in one match for the Norway national football team in 1908.

References

External links
 

1887 births
1938 deaths
Norwegian footballers
Norway international footballers
Place of birth missing
Association football defenders